Conrad Brunner (31 August 1859 in Diessenhofen – 8 June 1927 in Zurich) was a Swiss physician, surgeon and medical historian. He was particularly concerned with the disinfection of wounds and their healing.

Brunner came from a family of Swiss physicians and pharmacists, among whom was Johann Conrad Brunner. His father, John Brunner, was a physician and botanist. Brunner received medical degrees from the University of Zurich and the University of Leipzig, and went on to receive an advanced academic degree of Doctor of Medicine in 1885. He then completed his practical surgeon training studying under Rudolf Ulrich Krönlein. Beginning in 1888 he took a series of trips to noted surgeries, studying under Theodor Billroth at the University of Vienna, Ernst von Bergmann at Humboldt University of Berlin, and other surgeons at the University of Leipzig, the University of Dresden and the University of Münich. In 1888, with the third volume in 1889, he published his Erfahrungen und Studien über Wundinfektion und Wundbehandlung.

Life
In 1889 Brunner married Clara Margot and opened a private practice in Zurich, with privileges at a number of nearby hospitals. Beginning in 1890 he served as an associate professor of surgery at the University of Zurich, relinquishing the position in 1897.  From 1896 to 1922 he served as the chief physician at the Cantonal Hospital in Münsterlingen. In 1922 he was the co-founder of the Thurgauisch-Schaffhausischen Pulmonary Sanatorium in Davos, primarily for tuberculosis sufferers.

Work
Conrad Brunner conducted and published clinical, bacteriological and experimental studies on the effectiveness of various contemporary wound disinfection methods. He was able to prove that his method, namely the Brunner's Jodalkoholdesinfektion, offered by far the best guarantee against the occurrence of wound diseases.

Brunner researched and published on topics in the history of medicine, mostly as related to Switzerland.

Selected publications
  in three volumes.

Honours
 1921 Conrad Brunner received the Marcel Benoist Prize in recognition of his achievements in the field of wound care and wound disinfection.
 1922 Conrad Brunner received an honorary philosophy doctorate from the University of Zurich for his research on the history of medicine.

Notes

Further reading

External links
 

1859 births
1927 deaths
People from Frauenfeld District
19th-century Swiss physicians
20th-century Swiss physicians
Academic staff of the University of Zurich
Leipzig University alumni
University of Zurich alumni